31st London Film Critics Circle Awards
11 February 2011

Film of the Year: 
 The Social Network 

British Film of the Year: 
 The King's Speech 

The 31st London Film Critics Circle Awards, honouring the best in film for 2010, were announced by the London Film Critics Circle on 11 February 2011.

Winners and nominees

Film of the Year
The Social Network
Black Swan
The Kids Are All Right
The King's Speech
Toy Story 3

British Film of the Year
The King's Speech
127 Hours
Another Year
The Arbor
Monsters

Foreign Language Film of the Year
Of Gods and Men • FranceDogtooth • Greece
I Am Love • Italy
The Secret in Their Eyes • Argentina
Uncle Boonmee Who Can Recall His Past Lives • Thailand

Director of the YearDavid Fincher – The Social Network
Darren Aronofsky – Black Swan
Joel and Ethan Coen – True Grit
Christopher Nolan – Inception
Apichatpong Weerasethakul – Uncle Boonmee Who Can Recall His Past Lives

British Director of the Year
Tom Hooper – The King's Speech
Clio Barnard – The Arbor
Danny Boyle – 127 Hours
Mike Leigh – Another Year
Christopher Nolan – Inception

Screenwriter of the Year
Aaron Sorkin – The Social Network
Chris Morris, Jesse Armstrong and Sam Bain – Four Lions
Lisa Cholodenko and Stuart Blumberg – The Kids Are All Right
David Seidler – The King's Speech
Joel and Ethan Coen – True Grit

Breakthrough British Filmmaker
Gareth Edwards – Monsters
Banksy – Exit Through the Gift Shop
Clio Barnard – The Arbor
J Blakeson – The Disappearance of Alice Creed
Chris Morris – Four Lions

Actor of the Year
Colin Firth – The King's Speech
Jeff Bridges – True Grit
Jesse Eisenberg – The Social Network
Ryan Gosling – Blue Valentine
Édgar Ramírez – Carlos

Actress of the Year
Annette Bening – The Kids Are All Right
Jennifer Lawrence – Winter's Bone
Natalie Portman – Black Swan
Noomi Rapace – The Girl with the Dragon Tattoo
Hailee Steinfeld – True Grit

British Actor of the Year
Christian Bale – The Fighter
Riz Ahmed – Four Lions
Jim Broadbent – Another Year
Colin Firth – The King's Speech
Andrew Garfield – Never Let Me Go

British Actress of the Year
Lesley Manville – Another Year
Helena Bonham Carter – The King's Speech
Rosamund Pike – Barney's Version
Ruth Sheen – Another Year
Tilda Swinton – I Am Love

British Supporting Actor of the Year
Andrew Garfield – The Social Network
David Bradley – Another Year
Pierce Brosnan – The Ghost Writer
Tom Hardy – Inception
Peter Wight – Another Year

British Supporting Actress of the Year
Olivia Williams – The Ghost Writer
Helena Bonham Carter – Alice in Wonderland
Christine Bottomley – The Arbor
Minnie Driver – Barney's Version
Rosamund Pike – Made in Dagenham

Young British Performer of the Year
Conor McCarron – Neds
Jessica Barden – Tamara Drewe
Will Poulter – The Chronicles of Narnia: The Voyage of the Dawn Treader
Saoirse Ronan – The Way Back
Thomas Turgoose – The Scouting Book for Boys

Dilys Powell Award
Kristin Scott Thomas

References

2
2010 film awards
2010 in British cinema
2010 in London